"Solo Yo" (English: "Only Me") is a vocal duet credited to Mexican singer Sofía Reyes and Dominican-American singer Prince Royce. The song was released on January 29, 2016 as the third single from Reyes debut studio album, Louder! (2017). It received a Lo Nuestro nomination for Pop/Rock Song of the Year.

An English version was released on March 11, 2016 under the title "Nobody But Me".

Charts

Certifications

References

 
2016 singles
Prince Royce songs
Sofía Reyes songs
Spanish-language songs
Male–female vocal duets